How Dare You! is the fourth album by British band 10cc. Released in 1976, it included UK hit singles "I'm Mandy Fly Me" and "Art for Art's Sake". The album was the band's third to have cover artwork by the Hipgnosis creative team.

It was also the last 10cc album by the original line-up of Eric Stewart, Graham Gouldman, Kevin Godley and Lol Creme (the latter two departed shortly thereafter to form Godley & Creme), until the four reformed (albeit briefly) for the 1992 album ...Meanwhile.

Writing and recording 
In an interview at the time of its release, Gouldman told Melody Maker music newspaper: "It's as different as any album by the same band can be, and I think it's a progression from the last one. I think there's been a progression on every album and I think we've done it again. It's a strange mixture of songs. There's one about divorce, a song about schizophrenia, a song about wanting to rule the world, the inevitable money song, and an instrumental."

Critical reception 

Village Voice critic Robert Christgau wrote in his review of the album: "The putrefaction isn't as extreme as on last year's hit album, but the affliction would seem permanent—they don't know whether they're supposed to be funny or pretty, and so nine times out of ten they're neither."

Track listing

Bonus tracks

Bonus tracks on the 1997 CD edition

Bonus tracks on Japanese 2008 CD edition

Personnel 
10cc

 Eric Stewart – lead guitar (all tracks), backing vocals (3, 4, 7-9), lead vocals (2, 4, 6, 7), piano (4, 6, 7), bass guitar (2, 6), electric piano (4, 6, 7), pedal steel (7)
 Lol Creme – backing vocals (2-7, 9), Moog synthesizer (1, 2, 4, 6, 7, 9), piano (2, 3, 9), lead vocals (3, 6, 8), rhythm guitar (1, 6-8), lead guitar (1, 4, 9), maracas (1, 6, 7, 9), clavinet (1, 2), organ (3, 5), Gizmo (5, 9), electric piano (8, 9), sleigh bells (1), tambourine (2), vibraphone (4), recorder (6)
 Graham Gouldman – bass guitar (1, 3-5, 7-9), backing vocals (2-6, 8, 9), rhythm guitar (2, 5, 6, 9), tambourine (2, 6), zither (4), lead vocals (5, 6), cowbell (6), glockenspiel (7), slide guitar (7)
 Kevin Godley – backing vocals (all but 1), drums (1-4, 6-8), lead vocals (5, 7, 9), congas (1, 5), timpani (3, 5), cowbell (1), bongos (1), triangle (2), maracas (3), temple blocks (6), tambourine (8), castanets (9), cabasa (9)

Additional musician

 Mair Jones – harp (9)

Charts

Weekly charts

Year-end charts

Certifications

References 

10cc albums
1976 albums
Albums with cover art by Hipgnosis
Mercury Records albums
Albums recorded at Strawberry Studios